Cyclophora paratropa is a moth in the  family Geometridae. It is found in Tanzania.

References

Endemic fauna of Tanzania
Moths described in 1920
Cyclophora (moth)
Insects of Tanzania
Moths of Africa